Hurricane #1 are an English rock band, formed in Oxford in 1996. The band were formed by former Ride guitarist Andy Bell, along with vocalist / guitarist Alex Lowe, bassist  Will Pepper and drummer Gareth "Gaz" Farmer. After releasing two albums, Hurricane #1 (1997) and Only the Strongest Will Survive (1999), the band broke up. Bell went on to join Gay Dad and then eventually Oasis, while Lowe ventured into a solo career. Fronted by Lowe, the band reformed in 2014 and released their third album, Find What You Love and Let It Kill You, in November 2015.

History

Formation, Hurricane #1 and Only the Strongest Will Survive (1996–99)
Wishing to perform the later-day sound of his former band Ride, vocalist/guitarist Andy Bell formed Hurricane #1. Signed to Creation Records (along with fellow bands such as Oasis, The Jesus and Mary Chain and Primal Scream) they released their debut album in 1997, entitled Hurricane #1. This included their first single, "Step into My World", which reached number 29 in the UK Singles Chart (and a Paul Oakenfold remix of which reached number 19 in 1997), and other less successful singles "Just Another Illusion" and "Chain Reaction".

In 1999, the follow-up album Only the Strongest Will Survive spawned the band's other highest-charting single, also called "Only the Strongest Will Survive". The song reached number 19 in 1998.

Break up (1999–2014)
In 1999, Bell parted ways with Hurricane #1, joining Gay Dad on guitar. Shortly after joining Gay Dad, Bell split from the band to become the bass player for Oasis. In 2004, a double disc compilation of their songs was released, entitled Step into My World.

Former Hurricane #1 vocalist / guitarist Lowe has pursued a solo career, and has released three albums to date. In 2007, Lowe announced a new project called Garage Flowers, and a single, "Where To Begin", was released via iTunes. In 2013, Lowe formed his project band called Gun Club Cemetery, and already released the self-titled debut album in the same year.

Reformation (2014–present)
In November 2014, it was announced that Hurricane #1 had reunited without Bell, Farmer, and Pepper. The line-up, fronted by Lowe, featured the Mariani brothers, Carlo and Lucas, on guitar and bass respectively, and Chris Campbell on drums. The band's third album, Find What You Love and Let It Kill You, was released on 26 November 2015 through German-based label Tapete. Bell features "Think of the Sunshine". Lowe wrote the album while he was undergoing treatment for cancer in hospital. Lowe explained that "When you are wired up to chemo and radio therapy, the last thing you want to do is wallow in it and feel sorry for yourself so I had the idea that the album should be happy and not too dark."

Melodic Rainbows, the band's fourth album, was released on 12 October 2016 in Japan. The album will be released in the UK in November 2017. The band were set to play Beano on the Sea festival in September and the Shiine On Weekender in November. After Melodic Rainbows was released, bass player Lucas Mariani decided to quit the band, and was replaced by Chris Mullin. Later, Mullin left the band, and was replaced himself by former The Seahorses' bassist Stuart Fletcher in October 2018.

The band toured in early 2018. They released a single via download every month from September 2017 until some time in 2018. Guitarist Carlo Mariani left the band in early 2019, and was replaced by Jon Roberts. The band's fifth studio album, Buddah at the Gas Pump was released on 12 July 2019.

Discography 

Studio albums
 Hurricane #1 (1997)
 Only the Strongest Will Survive (1999)
 Find What You Love and Let It Kill You (2015)
 Melodic Rainbows (2016)
 Buddah At The Gas Pump (2019)

Members 
Current
Alex Lowe: lead vocals, guitar (1996–1999, 2014–present)
Jon Roberts: guitar (2019–present)
Stuart Fletcher: bass (2018–present)
Chris Campbell: drums (2014–present)

Past
Andy Bell: guitar, vocals, keyboards (1996–1999)
Will Pepper: bass (1996–1999)
Gareth "Gaz" Farmer: drums (1996–1999)
Lucas Mariani: bass (2014–2016)
Chris Mullin: bass (2016–2018)
Carlo Mariani: guitar (2014–2019)

Timeline

Timeline

References
 Citations

Sources

External links 
  Hurricane#1 fansite with archived news, reviews and interviews
  US Hurricane#1 fansite

Britpop groups
Creation Records artists
Music in Oxford
Musical groups established in 1996
Musical groups disestablished in 1999
Musical groups from Oxford
English alternative rock groups
Musical groups reestablished in 2014
Tapete Records artists